Buddy breathing is a rescue technique used in scuba diving "out of gas" emergencies, when two divers share one demand valve, alternately breathing from it. Techniques have been developed for buddy breathing from both twin-hose and single hose regulators, but to a large extent it has been superseded by safer and more reliable techniques using additional equipment, such as the use of a bailout cylinder or breathing through a secondary demand valve on the rescuer's regulator.

Running out of breathing gas most commonly happens as a result of poor gas management. It can also happen due to unforeseen exertion or breathing equipment failure. Equipment failure resulting in the loss of all gas could be caused by failure of a pressure retaining component such as an O-ring or hose in the regulator or, in cold conditions, a freezing of water in the regulator resulting in a free flow from the demand valve.

Technique

Buddy breathing is usually initialised by the diver with the "out of air" emergency signalling this to another diver by a standard hand signal "give me air". This signal is made by holding the fingers and thumb of one hand together, pointing them at the mouth and making repeated movements of the finger tips towards the mouth.

The donor is expected to take a good breath and pass their demand valve (or mouthpiece in the case of a twin-hose regulator) to the recipient, who is expected to take two good breaths and pass it back. In reality the recipient will often take more than two breaths, and the donor should expect this and relax to minimize metabolic rate. The donor should retain a good grip on the demand valve throughout the buddy breathing process, as a panicked recipient may fail to give it back. A reasonably reliable way of keeping control of the demand valve is to grasp the hose firmly in the fist where it connects to the demand valve. This provides good control but allows the recipient to use the purge button if needed.

A pattern of two breaths per diver should be established as soon as possible and then terminate the dive and start the ascent as soon as possible, as air consumption while buddy breathing is usually more than double the normal rate. Most demand valves will only drain correctly if the hose is to the user's right, and in these cases the divers should align themselves to allow convenient movement of the demand valve from donor to recipient and back. When the divers need to ascend or swim horizontally, it requires co-ordination and some skill, which is best practiced in a low hazard environment.

Training
A study by the UCLA Diving Safety Research Project suggests that about 20 successful repetitions of buddy breathing during training of entry level students are needed for a reasonable expectation of success without errors, and retesting after three months without reinforcing practice showed degraded performance and procedural errors. This is a higher level of training than provided by most recreational diver training organisations. For the skill to be reliable in an emergency, periodic reinforcement is necessary, and familiarisation is particularly valuable when buddies are to dive together for the first time.

Hazards
Buddy breathing is one of the few scuba skills in which the incompetence of one diver can threaten the life of another. Poor buddy breathing performance has resulted in the death of both divers on more than one occasion.

History
Buddy breathing originated from military diving following a prohibition on the training and practice of free ascents.

The procedure has been used since the beginnings of recreational diving, and along with the free ascent was one of the ways a diver could respond to running out of air at depth. At this time twin-hose regulators were the norm. and it was reasonably easy for two divers in a face-to-face position to share the regulator mouthpiece. Buddy breathing was an important skill before reserve valves and submersible pressure gauges were generally available, and running out of air was so common that it was not considered an emergency. By the mid-1960s the availability of submersible pressure gauges made reliable air supply monitoring possible and running out of air became less common.

In the late 1960s single-hose regulators started to take over as the standard, and this complicated the buddy breathing procedure. The single hose exhaust valve position at the bottom of most DVs made it necessary to offset the recipient to the right side when face to face, or to the left when side by side. The standard procedure of continuous exhalation during ascent to avoid lung over-pressure injury could leave the diver with insufficient air to clear the regulator, so it was necessary to hold the DV in a way that did not obstruct the recipient from accessing the purge button, as the single hose would not normally free flow when raised above the head. The increasing popularity of the buoyancy compensator was another complication, as it is necessary to periodically vent it during an ascent to avoid a runaway expansion of the contents and an uncontrolled buoyant ascent. This requires the use of one hand. the other is needed to control the regulator and hold on to the other diver, a moderately complex set of simultaneous tasks. It is possible to coordinate these activities, but this requires greater skill than with the original procedure, and therefore more intensive training to perform reliably. Since running out of air was becoming less common, the procedure was practiced less often, and skills generally deteriorated. The use of a secondary (octopus) second stage or a bailout cylinder removes the necessity for this complex and relatively stressful procedure.

In the 1990s there was also growing concern about the transmission of disease by sharing a mouthpiece, particularly as a better option was available at a reasonable cost.
Dive Training magazine ran an article by Alex Brylske in November 1993 detailing the hazards of buddy breathing and the advantages of alternative systems, and over the following years the practice was phased out of most recreational diver training programmes in favour of the use of secondary second stages and where applicable, a controlled emergency swimming ascent.

Alternatives 

Most recreational and professional diver training organisations would consider relying on buddy breathing from a single regulator as an unacceptable risk, as the use of a secondary demand valve (octopus) or second regulator, either from an alternative scuba cylinder, or from the primary scuba set, is a far more reliable and safe method of supplying emergency air to a diver who is part of a planned team or buddy dive, and a solo diver should carry their own emergency gas supply. There should never be a situation on a well planned and executed dive where two divers need to share a single demand valve, but the technique is still considered useful by some diving schools as it teaches control and hones skills under difficult circumstances.

Buddy breathing is discouraged by many training agencies because other more reliable techniques and equipment exist. The technique needs training and regular practice by both divers if it is to be used successfully in a crisis; panic and task loading being the main reasons for it failing. Especially in situations in which one or both of the participants are not well-trained in the technique, the procedure has been criticised for endangering two people instead of one.

Many divers fit a second demand valve, often called an "octopus", to their diving regulators, for emergency use by another diver. Some go so far as to recognise that the out-of-air diver will want the demand valve they are breathing off at the time, as it is indisputably providing breathing gas, and almost certainly a gas suitable for the current depth. These practice "" in recognition of this tendency, and often use an extra-long hose (up to 7 ft long) to facilitate the procedure in tight spaces. These divers often wear the secondary demand valve on a "" which keeps it ready for immediate use under the diver's chin, where it can be retrieved for use without the use of the hands.

Divers doing deep diving, cave or wreck penetration, or decompression stops may routinely carry a complete, independent bailout scuba set for their own or their buddy's emergency use. This is particularly prevalent in professional diving operations where it is often mandatory.

Use of other emergency air sources such as octopus second stage, integrated DV/BC inflator units, bailout cylinders etc. also requires the learning of appropriate skills. These procedures are as complex as buddy breathing up to the point of sharing, and the fundamental difference is that the donor and recipient are not required to alternate breathing with a period when no air is available, which can be a big advantage. These alternatives to buddy breathing also require substantial learning and reinforcement to be reliable in a stressful situation.

Avoidance 
In most cases the need for buddy-breathing or other gas related emergency is avoidable. The equipment is highly reliable when in good condition, and though occasionally breakdowns will occur without warning, in most cases user inspection and testing before the dive, combined with a reasonable planned maintenance schedule carried out by a competent person will pick up potential problems before they escalate to an emergency. Realistic gas planning and monitoring of the remaining gas supply in context of the time required to surface safely will prevent almost all out-of gas emergencies. Carrying a fully redundant emergency gas supply allows the diver to bail out independently of outside assistance if in spite of all precautions, an emergency does occur.

References

Underwater diving emergency procedures